Brigadier General Donald Myron "Buck" Schmuck, (USMC ret.) (August 16, 1915 – January 24, 2004) was a United States Marine Corps brigadier general who served with distinction during World War II and the Korean War — and was awarded the Navy Cross and two Silver Stars for his heroic actions.

Biography
Schmuck grew up in Denver and on the family ranch near Walden, Colorado. He attended the University of Colorado and the U.S. Coast Guard Academy having enlisted in the Marine Corps in 1935 and was later commissioned a second lieutenant in 1938 following graduation from university.

After basic training, he served as a platoon leader at San Diego Marine Corps Base, then served in the South Pacific with the 2nd Marine Brigade during World War II, seeing action in Guadalcanal, Vella Lavella, and Bougainville as a rifle company commander. He was hospitalized briefly from injuries sustained in Bougainville and then joined the 1st Marine Division in time for landings on Peleliu and, later, Okinawa, where he was again wounded in action. He was a lieutenant colonel commanding an infantry battalion training for the invasion of Japan when the war ended.

Donald Schmuck attended the Amphibious Warfare School at Quantico, Virginia, and the Army Airborne School at Fort Benning, Georgia, then did a short tour with the 82nd Airborne Division at Fort Bragg, North Carolina, before returning to Quantico as an instructor in the Marine Corps Schools.

In 1949 he was ordered to the United Nations Middle Eastern Commission and was active in Lebanon, Israel, Jordan, Syria, Egypt, and Iraq. Schmuck joined the 1st Marine Division at the start of the Korean War in 1950, assigned as commander, 1st Battalion, 1st Marines under the regimental command of Col. Chesty Puller. He led the 1st Battalion in action during 1950 and 1951, including the Chosin Reservoir operation and the Spring Counter Offensive. He served as regimental executive through the Summer Offensive and served with the Fleet Marine Force Pacific at Pearl Harbor after Korea. During that duty, Schmuck was charged with producing a number of contingency war plans covering national objectives in Asia, including several locations in Vietnam, and he conducted the in-country reconnaissance required for those plans. In 1959 he attended the Army War College at Carlisle Barracks, Pennsylvania.

Schmuck retired from the Marine Corps in 1960 with the rank of brigadier general, continuing to be active in special missions in Central America, Vietnam, and Laos. He completed a PhD in nuclear physics at CU–Boulder in the early 1960s, and was a military observer during Desert Storm in February 1991 in the Gulf War.

He was active with the Marine Corps League in Wyoming and Hawaii, and was a founding member of the Viet Nam Vets Motorcycle Club http://www.texasvnvmc.com . He purchased the Triangle-S ranch between Buffalo and Sheridan, Wyoming. He died, aged 88, in Honolulu and is buried at Arlington National Cemetery.

He never married and is survived by his brother, retired Cmdr. Carl Schmuck of Anacortes, Washington, and numerous nieces and nephews.

Awards
General Schmuck's decorations include:

See also

References

.  Also available from ibiblio.org.

 Includes information about Schmuck's role at the Battle of Chosin Reservoir.

1915 births
2004 deaths
United States Marine Corps generals
United States Marine Corps personnel of World War II
United States Marine Corps personnel of the Korean War
Recipients of the Navy Cross (United States)
Recipients of the Silver Star
Recipients of the Legion of Merit
Recipients of the Air Medal
People from Denver
People from Honolulu
People from Jackson County, Colorado
Burials at Arlington National Cemetery
Military personnel from Colorado